Onatsu and Seijuro is a 1954 black-and-white Japanese film directed by Taizo Fuyushima.

Cast 
 Raizo Ichikawa

References

External links 
 

Japanese black-and-white films
1954 films
1950s Japanese films